Nationalist China may refer to:
 Republic of China (1912–1949), under Kuomintang rule 1928–1949 
 Nationalist government from 1925–48, also known as the Second Republic of China
 Free area of the Republic of China, ruled by the Kuomintang on Taiwan before democratization, during the Cold War occasionally referred to by the West as "Free China"